This is a list of coffee dishes, which includes foods that use coffee as a primary ingredient, and for which coffee is an essential ingredient. Coffee beverages are omitted from this list.

Coffee dishes

 Café liégeois – a cold dessert made from lightly sweetened coffee, coffee flavored ice cream and chantilly cream.
 Chocolate-covered coffee bean – eaten alone and used as a garnish on dishes and foods
 Coffee jelly
 Coffee sauce
 Espresso rub
 Espresso pork ribs
 Roti Kopi / Roti papa / Roti mama
 Red-eye gravy
 Tiramisu – prepared using coffee liqueur
Opera cake - an almond sponge cake flavored by dipping in coffee syrup, layered with ganache and coffee-flavored french buttercream, and covered in a chocolate glaze.

See also
 List of coffee beverages

References

 
Coffee